Frenches Creek is a rural locality in the Scenic Rim Region, Queensland, Australia.

Geography

Teviot Brook enter the locality from the south (Bunjurgen) where it forms the south-eastern boundary of the locality and then exits towards the east (Dugundan). The watercourse Frenches Creek (from which the localiity presumably takes its name) rises in the north-west of the locality on the slopes of Mount French and becomes a tributary to Teviot Brook. 

Mount Alford Road enters the locality from the east (Dugundan) and exits to the south (Bunjurgen).

There is some irrigated cropping near Teviot Brook with most of the locality being used for grazing on native vegetation. The higher slopes of Mount French in the north-west of the locality are undeveloped.

History
The locality contains 36 households, in which 43.3% of the population are males and 56.7% of the population are females with a median age of 53, 15 years above the national average. The average weekly household income is $1,125, $313 below the national average.

Education 
There are no schools in Frenches Creek. The nearest government primary schools are Boonah State School in Boonah to the north-west and Mount Alford State School in Mount Alford to the south. The nearest government secondary school is Boonah State High School in Boonah to the north-west.

References 

Scenic Rim Region
Localities in Queensland